Third Turtle was a trimaran designed by Dick Newick in the 1970s.

In 1976 it finished third in a trans-Atlantic race, coming in after a boat more than twice its size and a giant over seven and a half times its size.

See also
List of multihulls
Dick Newick
Cheers (proa)
Trice (trimaran)

References

Trimarans
1970s sailing yachts